Croatia competed at the 1998 Winter Olympics in Nagano, Japan.

Alpine skiing

Men

Women

Cross-country skiing

Men

Figure skating

References

Official Olympic Reports

Nations at the 1998 Winter Olympics
1998
1998 in Croatian sport